XHMSN-FM is a radio station in Cadereyta, Nuevo León, serving Monterrey. Broadcasting on 96.5 FM, XHMSN is owned by Grupo Mass Comunicaciones and carries a news/talk format known as Dominio FM.

History
The concession history for XHMSN begins in Montemorelos, where the Gámez family founded XERN-AM Radio Naranjera in 1964. Thirty years later, Jorge Álvaro Gámez González received a concession for a second station there, XHMSN-FM 100.1. In its final years in Montemorelos it carried the Ke Buena name and a grupera format.

In 2012, Grupo Mass Communications applied to move XHMSN into the Monterrey metropolitan area on 96.5 with a major power increase to 100 kW. With the move to a transmitter in Cadereyta, XHMSN changed to the Dominio FM news/talk format.

References

Radio stations in Monterrey
Radio stations established in 1994